Yax, yax or YAX may refer to:

 Angling Lake/Wapekeka Airport (IATA airport code: YAX), in Ontario, Canada
 Mbunda language (ISO 639 language code: yax)
 Yax Lizard, an urban legend lizard
 Hugo Alfredo Tale-Yax, a notable victim of the bystander effect
 a yak character in the Disney film Zootopia
 Yax, one of the 18 months of the Haab', a part of the Maya calendric system